Bodellick is a hamlet in Cornwall, England, UK. It lies south of the tidal River Camel approximately one mile west of Wadebridge.

References

Hamlets in Cornwall